The 1979 Jackson State Tigers football team represented Jackson State University as a member of the Southwestern Athletic Conference (SWAC) during the 1979 NCAA Division I-AA football season. Led by fourth-year head coach W. C. Gorden, the Tigers compiled an overall record of 8–3 and a conference record of 4–2, placing third in the SWAC and ranking eighth nationally.

Schedule

References

Jackson State
Jackson State Tigers football seasons
Jackson State Tigers football